The FirstOntario Performing Arts Centre is a  cultural complex located in downtown St. Catharines, Ontario. It opened in 2015 as the result of a partnership between the City of St. Catharines and Brock University, which share the venue for production, performance and learning purposes. Designed by Diamond Schmitt Architects to host a variety of international and local performing artists, it comprises four separate venues: a 770-seat concert hall (Partridge Hall), 300-seat recital hall, 210-seat multi-purpose dance/theatre venue (Robertson Theatre), and the 199-seat Film House.

The creation of the centre spurred a cultural and economic renaissance in downtown St. Catharines along with neighbouring its neighbouring Meridian Centre and Brock University's Marilyn I. Walker School of Fine and Performing Arts.

References

External links
 

Buildings and structures in St. Catharines
Brock University
2015 establishments in Ontario
Theatres in Ontario
Cinemas and movie theatres in Ontario
Music venues in Ontario